The RAM 02 was an open-wheel Formula One race car, designed, developed, and built by British team and constructor RAM in .

Complete Formula One results
(key)

References 

RAM Formula One cars